Ghar-e-Pariyan is a cave near Isfahan. It is situated at an altitude of 2967 m above sea level. Its entrance measures approximately 1.6 x 1.2 meters. Its coordinates are "".

See also
Geography of Iran
List of caves in Iran

References

Archaeological sites in Iran
Caves of Iran
Landforms of Isfahan Province
Tourist attractions in Isfahan Province